George Keith (born 26 May 1944) is a Scottish-born former footballer who represented Australia in the late 1960s. Keith is a member of the Football Federation Australia - Football Hall of Fame.

Playing career

Club career
1959 – 1961. Keith was signed by Arsenal F.C. as an apprentice professional footballer, after Arsenal's chief scout saw him playing for Glasgow Schoolboys v London Schoolboys at Wembley Stadium.
At the end of his term with Arsenal he returned to Scotland to take up a professional career with Greenock Morton and Third Lanark in the Scottish Division One.
In 1965 Keith migrated to Australia where he played for Melbourne Hakoah and A.P.I.A. Leichhardt. Keith also represented Victoria and New South Wales.

International career
Keith in 1967 made his debut for the Australian national football team. He played 22 times, including 20 in full internationals, for the Socceroos, playing in the unsuccessful Australian qualification for the 1970 FIFA World Cup.

Honours
In 2008 Keith was inducted into the Football Federation Australia - Football Hall of Fame in the Award of Distinction category. In 2013, Keith was named in Australia's team of the decade for the years 1963–1970.

References

Australian soccer players
Ayr United F.C. players
Greenock Morton F.C. players
Guildford City F.C. players
Third Lanark A.C. players
APIA Leichhardt FC players
Scottish footballers
1944 births
Living people
Association football defenders